Adam Rubin is a #1 New York Times best selling author of children's books. Many of his stories feature animals or food and several contain interactive elements. His books have sold over one million copies. Rubin graduated from Washington University in St. Louis where he studied advertising and worked as an advertising creative director for ten years before leaving his day job to focus on writing books. In addition to writing, he also curates and designs puzzles and magic tricks.

Select bibliography 
 Ice Cream Machine, illustrated by Daniel Salmieri, Charles Santoso, Liniers, Emily Hughes, Nicole Miles, and Seaerra Miller (Penguin, 2022) , 
 High Five, illustrated by Daniel Salmieri (Penguin, 2019) 
 El Chupacabras, illustrated by Crash McCreery (Penguin, 2018) 
 Dragons Love Tacos 2: The Sequel, illustrated by Daniel Salmieri (Penguin, 2017) 
 Robo-Sauce, illustrated by Daniel Salmieri (Penguin, 2015) 
 Big Bad Bubble, illustrated by Daniel Salmieri (Houghton Mifflin, 2014) 
 Secret Pizza Party, illustrated by Daniel Salmieri (Penguin, 2013) 
 Dragons Love Tacos, illustrated by Daniel Salmieri (Penguin, 2012)  
 Those Darn Squirrels Fly South, illustrated by Daniel Salmieri (Houghton Mifflin, 2012) 
 Those Darn Squirrels and the Cat Next Door, illustrated by Daniel Salmieri (Houghton Mifflin, 2011) 
 Those Darn Squirrels, illustrated by Daniel Salmieri (Houghton Mifflin, 2008) ,

Awards and honors

 2020 – Texas Bluebonnet Award (winner)
 2018 – The E.B. White Read Aloud Award (honoree)

References 

Washington University in St. Louis alumni
Date of birth missing (living people)
21st-century American male writers
American children's writers
Year of birth missing (living people)
Living people